Saint Bavo of Ghent (also known as Bavon, Allowin, Bavonius, Baaf; AD 622–659) is a Roman Catholic and Eastern Orthodox saint. He was the son of Pepin of Landen and the brother of saints Begga and Gertrude of Nivelles.

Life 
Bavo was born near Liège, to a Frankish noble family that gave him the name Allowin. His father was Pippin of Landen, the Mayor of the Palace of Austrasia, and his mother Itta of Metz.

A wild, young aristocrat of Brabant, he contracted a beneficial marriage, and had a daughter. He was a soldier who led an undisciplined and disorderly life. Shortly after the death of his wife, Bavo decided to reform after hearing a sermon preached by Saint Amand on the emptiness of material things. On returning to his house he distributed his wealth to the poor, and then received the tonsure from Amand.

For some time thereafter, Bavo joined Amand in the latter's missionary travels throughout France and Flanders. On one occasion, Bavo met a man whom he had sold into slavery years before. Wishing to atone for his earlier deed, Bavo had the man lead him by a chain to the town jail. Bavo built an abbey on his grounds and became a monk. He distributed his belongings to the poor and lived as a recluse, first in a hollow tree and later in a cell in the forest by the Abbey. 

He died at the Abbey in Ghent, in what is today Belgium.

Veneration 
Bavo is the patron saint of Ghent, Zellik, and Lauwe in Belgium, and Haarlem in the Netherlands. His feast in the Catholic Church and the Eastern Orthodox Church is October 1.

He is most often shown in Christian art as a knight with a sword and falcon. The most popular scene is the moment of his conversion, which has many stories attached to it. Because he is so often shown with a falcon, he came to be considered the patron saint of falconry. In medieval Ghent, taxes were paid on Bavo's feast day, and it is for this reason he is often shown holding a purse or money bag.

According to Rodulfus Glaber, the city of Bamberg is named after him, with Bamberg meaning "Mount of Bavo".

Legacy 
Several churches are dedicated to him, including:
 Saint Bavo Cathedral, in Ghent
 Sint-Bavokerk and Cathedral of Saint Bavo, both in Haarlem
 Sint-Bavokerk in Heemstede, Lauwe, and Zellik
 Saint Bavo Church and School, in Mishawaka, Indiana
  in Wilrijk

His picture is also part of the Coat of Arms of the Antwerp suburb Wilrijk.
Rembrandt painted a Saint Bavo, dated between 1662 and 1665.

Images

References 

 Attwater, Donald and Catherine Rachel John. The Penguin Dictionary of Saints. 3rd edition. New York: Penguin Books, 1993. .

External links 

  San Bavone di Gand
 Latin Saints of the Orthodox Patriarchate of Rome
 Acta S. Bavonis alias Alloini confessoris, Gandavensium patroni
 St. Bavo at the Christian Iconography website.
 Vita Bavonis Confessoris Gandavensis (Life of Bavo, Confessor of Ghent, in Latin) in Monumenta Germaniae Historica

589 births
654 deaths
Frankish warriors
Pippinids
Clergy from Liège
Belgian hermits
Belgian Roman Catholic saints
7th-century Frankish saints